Guido Aristarco (7 October 1918 – 11 September 1996) was an Italian film critic and author.

Biography
Born in Fossacesia, Chieti, at very young age Aristarco debuted as a film critic for the newspapers La Gazzetta di Mantova and Il Corriere Padano and then for the magazine Cinema.

A dean of the Marxist film criticism, influenced by the thought of  Antonio Gramsci and György Lukács, for whom he wrote the preface of The Destruction of Reason, in 1952 he founded and  edited (until his death) the film magazine Cinema Nuovo. He was also the first  university professor of cinema in Italy, first in Turin and later in Rome.

Aristarco was a jury member of the Venice Film Festival three times, in 1948, 1963, and 1985.

References

External links
 

1918 births
1996 deaths
Italian essayists
Italian male non-fiction writers
Italian film critics
20th-century Italian people
People from Fossacesia
Male essayists
Italian magazine founders
Italian magazine editors
20th-century essayists